Bultfontein is a town in the Free State province of South Africa with a total population of about 23,400 people. The town site was laid out in 1873; it had been delayed because of a location dispute which also led to the establishment of Hoopstad  to the north-west. The township of Phahameng was established on the outskirts of Bultfontein in the 1970s.

According to the 2011 census, Bultfontein proper has a population of 2,176, while Phahameng has a population of 21,189, giving the urban area a total population of 23,365. Of this population 93% described themselves as Black African, 5.5% as White, and 0.5% as Coloured. 57% spoke Sotho as their home language, 23% spoke Xhosa, 9.5% spoke Tswana and 6% spoke Afrikaans as first language.

Bultfontein has 8 public schools. Two are high schools,three are combined schools, and three are primary schools. The town is 60km away from Welkom and 80km away from Bloemfontein.It has several retail stores.

References

Populated places in the Tswelopele Local Municipality
Populated places established in 1873